Meltham is a civil parish in the metropolitan borough of Kirklees, West Yorkshire, England.  It contains 60 listed buildings that are recorded in the National Heritage List for England.  Of these, one is listed at Grade II*, the middle of the three grades, and the others are at Grade II, the lowest grade.  The parish contains the village of Meltham and the smaller settlements of Helme and Wilshaw, and is otherwise rural.  Until the Industrial Revolution the economy of the parish depended mainly on agriculture, and many of the listed buildings are farmhouses and farm buildings.  The Industrial Revolution brought the textile industry to the area, and this was initially a domestic process.  Many of the listed buildings are weavers' cottages and other houses used for spinning wool, and these are characterised by long rows of mullioned windows, mainly in the upper storeys.  Most of the listed buildings are constructed from stone and have roofs of stone slate.  The other listed buildings include other houses and associated structures, churches and items in churchyards, former Sunday schools, a well head, milestones, boundary markers, a bridge, two kissing gates, mills, a mausoleum, almshouses, a village hall, and a telephone kiosk.


Key

Buildings

References

Citations

Sources

Lists of listed buildings in West Yorkshire